Syed Emdad Ali (1875–1956), was a Bengali poet and writer. He was born in Munshiganj District, Bengal, now in Bangladesh. He was against the use of highly Sanskritised vocabulary in Bangla as well as the unnecessary use of Persian and Arabic words. A liberal humanist, Emdad Ali believed in communal harmony.

Early life 
Ali was born in 1875 in Bikrampur, Bengal Presidency, British India. He graduated from Munshiganj High School and Jagannath College (which is Jagannath University today). He did not pursue further studies due to financial issues.

Career
Ali taught at a school in Netrokona District after college. He joined the British Indian Imperial Police as a Sub-Inspector. He was awarded the title Khan Shahib for by British Indian government for his service. He was against the inclusion of Arabic, Persian, and Sanskrit words in the Bengali language.

In 1903, he joined Nandoor, a Bengali monthly journal as an editor. In one of his editorials, he wrote, 'The development of the downtrodden Muslim community will be achieved only through literary activities. We invite all Muslim writers in Bangla to join in our endeavour to awaken the Muslims of this country'.

Ali worked for many departments. He is a descendant of Bangal poet Kaykobad (1857). He was the chief editor of monthly ‘Nabanoor’(1903–06) with collaborations from M. Asad Ali,M.Hedayetullah and Qazi Imdadul Haq.

Works
His literary works were included in the curriculum of school level, secondary and higher secondary Bengali Literature in Bangladesh.

Main Books
Dali
Taposhi Rabeya (Rabeya the Pious)

Death 
Ali died in 1956.

References

Further reading
 Muslim Sahitya Prativa written by Helal M.Abu Taher and published by Islamic Foundation,1980
 Bangla Sahitya (Bengali Literature), the national text book of intermediate (college) level of Bangladesh published in 1996 by all educational boards.

1956 deaths
20th-century Bengali poets
Bengali-language poets
Bengali writers
Bengali-language writers
20th-century Indian poets
Bengali male poets
Indian male poets
20th-century Indian male writers
1875 births
People from Munshiganj District
Bengali Muslims